Artichoke Lake is a lake in Big Stone and Swift counties, Minnesota, in the United States.

Artichoke Lake is likely a translation of the Native American name, referring to the Jerusalem artichokes harvested there for food.

See also
List of lakes in Minnesota

References

Lakes of Big Stone County, Minnesota
Lakes of Swift County, Minnesota
Lakes of Minnesota